Petr Korda was the defending champion but lost in the semifinals to Goran Ivanišević.

Ivanišević won in the final 4–6, 6–4, 6–4, 7–6(7–3) against Thomas Muster.

Seeds

  Thomas Muster (final)
  Goran Ivanišević (champion)
  Petr Korda (semifinals)
  Alexander Volkov (first round)
  Karel Nováček (first round)
  Marc Rosset (quarterfinals)
  Amos Mansdorf (second round)
  MaliVai Washington (second round)

Draw

Final

Section 1

Section 2

External links
 1993 CA-TennisTrophy draw

Singles